Now is the Hour is an album by New Zealand singer Deane Waretini, best known for his 1981 hit single The Bridge. The album contains songs from the Bridge era as well as later recorded songs. Around the same time, Waretini also starred in a Scottie Douglas Productions television series of the same name.

Critical reception and charts
The album received a favourable review from The New Zealand Herald's Scott Kara, who said "it's Waretini's voice - deep, smooth and rich, like a block of crunchy chocolate - that make these songs special".

In September 2012, the album had reached no 2 in the IMNZ charts. By the 27th of that month and at its fourth week in the IMNZ charts, it had dropped down a notch to no 3. It spent two weeks in the New Zealand top 40 album charts, peaking at no 25.

Track listing

References

Deane Waretini albums
2012 albums